The 6th Moscow International Film Festival was held from 7 to 22 July 1969. The Golden Prizes were awarded to the Cuban film Lucía directed by Humberto Solás, the Italian film Serafino directed by Pietro Germi and the Soviet film We'll Live Till Monday directed by Stanislav Rostotsky.

Jury
 Sergei Gerasimov (USSR - President of the Jury)
 Dev Anand (India)
 Vija Artmane (USSR)
 King Vidor (USA)
 Erwin Geschonneck (East Germany)
 Anatoli Golovnya (USSR)
 Mbissine Thérèse Diop (Senegal)
 Zahari Zhandov (Bulgaria)
 Stanislav Zvonicek (Czechoslovakia)
 Jerzy Kawalerowicz (Poland)
 Ion Popescu-Gopo (Romania)
 Glauber Rocha (Brazil)
 István Szabó (Hungary)
 Alberto Sordi (Italy)
 Yves Ciampi (France)
 Madiha Yousri (Egypt)

Films in competition
The following films were selected for the main competition:

Awards
 Golden Prize:
 Lucía by Humberto Solás
 Serafino by Pietro Germi 
 We'll Live Till Monday by Stanislav Rostotsky
 Silver Prizes:
 Playtime by Jacques Tati
 When You Hear the Bells by Antun Vrdoljak
 Special Prizes:
 Carol Reed for Oliver!
 Annelie Thorndike, Andrew Thorndike for Diary of a German Woman
 Ivan Pyryev for The Brothers Karamazov
 Prizes:
 Best Actor: Ron Moody for Oliver!
 Best Actor: Tadeusz Łomnicki for Colonel Wolodyjowski
 Best Actress: Irina Petrescu for A Woman for a Season
 Best Actress: Ana María Picchio for Brief Heaven
 Diplomas:
 Scorched Earth by Knut Andersen
 Cabascabo by Oumarou Ganda
 Director: András Kovács for Walls
 Director of photography: Ivailo Tranchev for Tango
 Prix FIPRESCI: Lucía by Humberto Solás

References

External links
Moscow International Film Festival: 1969 at Internet Movie Database

1969
1969 film festivals
1969 in the Soviet Union
1969 in Moscow